Marcăuți is a commune in Briceni District, Moldova. It is composed of two villages, Marcăuți and Marcăuții Noi.

References

Communes of Briceni District